Riccardo Perpetuini (born 4 August 1990 in Latina, Italy) is an Italian  retired footballer.

Club career

Lazio
A native of Cisterna di Latina, just south of Rome, Perpetuini came through the successful youth academy at Lazio. He made his Serie A debut on 17 May 2009, coming on as a 69th-minute substitute for Ousmane Dabo in a 2–0 loss to Palermo at the Renzo Barbera.

He also played as left-back in 2009–10 season.

He retired in 2016 to start a career as a dentist.

Career statistics 

Statistics accurate as of match played 28 September 2009.

References

External links 
 
 Lazio Primavera – La Rosa della Primavera 2008–09

Living people
1990 births
Italian footballers
Italy youth international footballers
S.S. Lazio players
F.C. Crotone players
Calcio Foggia 1920 players
U.S. Salernitana 1919 players
L'Aquila Calcio 1927 players
U.S. Cremonese players
Mantova 1911 players
Serie A players
Serie B players
Serie C players
Association football midfielders
People from Latina, Lazio